Jane Marie Cordy (born July 2, 1950) is a Canadian Senator representing Nova Scotia and former teacher and administrator.

Early life
Born in Sydney, Nova Scotia, she received a teaching certificate from the Nova Scotia Teachers College and a Bachelor of Education from Mount Saint Vincent University. A teacher, she taught for the Sydney School Board, the Halifax County School Board, the New Glasgow School Board, and the Halifax Regional School Board.

Appointment to the Senate
Cordy was appointed to the Senate by Prime Minister Jean Chrétien on June 9, 2000. She has also served as Vice-Chair of the Halifax-Dartmouth Port Development Commission and as Chair of the Board of Referees for the Halifax Region of Human Resources Development Canada.

She sat in the Senate as a Liberal representing the senatorial division of Nova Scotia.

On January 29, 2014, Liberal Party leader Justin Trudeau announced all Liberal Senators, including Cordy, were removed from the Liberal caucus, and would continue sitting as Independents. The Senators referred to themselves as the Senate Liberal Caucus even though they were no longer members of the parliamentary Liberal caucus.

With the Senate Liberal Caucus facing losing official parliamentary caucus status in 2020 with a third of its caucus facing mandatory retirements on their turning age 75, Senator Joseph Day announced that the Senate Liberal Caucus had been dissolved and a new Progressive Senate Group formed in its wake, with the entire membership joining the new group, including this senator.

With Senator Day's mandatory retirement in January 2020, on December 12, 2019, Senator Jane Cordy tweeted that her colleagues in the PSG had selected her as the new leader, ostensibly effective that same date. Additionally, she subsequently announced later that day Senator Mercer would be moving into the Whip/Caucus Chair role, that Senator  would become the new Deputy Leader, and that the interim monikers were being removed at the same time.

References

External links
 
 Liberal Senate Forum

1950 births
Living people
Canadian educators
Canadian senators from Nova Scotia
Women members of the Senate of Canada
Liberal Party of Canada senators
Progressive Senate Group
Senate Liberal Caucus
People from Sydney, Nova Scotia
Women in Nova Scotia politics
21st-century Canadian politicians
21st-century Canadian women politicians